Offredi is an Italian surname. Notable people with the surname include:

 Andrea Offredi (born 1988), Italian footballer
 Apollinare Offredi, 15th-century Italian philosopher
 Daniel Offredi (born 1988), Italian footballer

Italian-language surnames